Shakespeare Street Wesleyan Reform Chapel is a former Wesleyan Reform church on Shakespeare Street in Nottingham. It is a Grade II listed building. It was converted in 1953 to a synagogue and is now a university hall.

History
The church was built in 1854 to designs by Thomas Simpson. The foundation stones were laid on 20 March 1854.

In 1941 the building suffered bomb damage and despite being restored after the war, the closing service was held on 11 October 1953. It was then converted to a synagogue of the Nottingham Hebrew Congregation, and in 2019 was converted and extended by Nottingham Trent University as their University Hall, for graduation ceremonies, concerts and other events.

Organ
A new organ was installed in 1914 by John Compton.

References

Methodist churches in Nottingham
Churches completed in 1854
Former Methodist churches in the United Kingdom
Synagogues in England
Grade II listed churches in Nottinghamshire
churches bombed by the Luftwaffe in Nottingham